The Silver Logie for Most Popular Australian Program was an award presented at the Australian TV Week Logie Awards. The award was given to recognise the popularity of Australian programs, originally state based awards and then awarded nationally.

It was first awarded at the 3rd Annual TV Week Logie Awards ceremony, held in 1961 when the award was originally called Most Popular Program. This award category was eliminated in 1966 and replaced by the Most Popular Live Show category. It was reintroduced in 1968 and renamed Best Show. Over the years, this category has also been known as Best Local Show (1970), Most Popular Show (1971, 1973–1985), Most Popular Series (1993–1997) and Most Popular Australian Program (2003–2004).

State Affair holds the record for the most wins, with fifteen, followed by Adelaide Tonight, The Mike Walsh Show and Neighbours with nine wins each.

National

States

New South Wales

Queensland

South Australia

Tasmania

Victoria

Western Australia

References

Awards established in 1961